Daphnella pagera is an extinct species of sea snail, a marine gastropod mollusc in the family Raphitomidae.

Description
The length of the shell attains 12.3 mm, its diameter 4.7 mm.

Distribution
Fossils of this marine species were found in Miocene strata in Panama; age range: 11.608 to 7.246 Ma.

References

 W. P. Woodring. 1970. Geology and paleontology of canal zone and adjoining parts of Panama: Description of Tertiary mollusks (gastropods: Eulimidae, Marginellidae to Helminthoglyptidae). United States Geological Survey Professional Paper 306(D):299–452

pagera
Gastropods described in 1970